Valsad railway station (station code:- BL) is a railway station of Western Railway Zone in the state of Gujarat, India. It serves the city of Valsad.

History 

Grand Road-Valsad section was opened in 1864. The length of Grand Road-Valsad section was 194 km. Valsad-Navsari section was opened in 1861. The length of Valsad-Navsari section was 39 km.

The railway station building was established in 1925.

Infrastructure 
Valsad is an A category railway station of Mumbai WR railway division of Western Railway zone of Indian Railways. Valsad is only non-junction railway station having five platforms and 3-4 freight sidings in South Gujarat. Adjacent to the railway station is the Valsad Electric Loco Shed which houses over 100 electric locomotives.

Valsad station has been renovated in European style recently. Valsad station's main entrance, waiting hall, ticket counter building, food stall, parking are revamped. The tiles floor, rain water harvesting and vertical garden have been added.

On 15 August 2021, The National Flag was hoisted at a height of more than 100 feet by Shri ARM Annu Tyagi of Valsad and added another dimension to Valsad's splendor.

Facilities 
The station offers the following amenities: WiFi, parking, ATM, food stalls, footover bridge, coach indicator, parcel office, passenger reservation center, waiting room and toilets.

Gallery

Major trains

The following trains start from Valsad railway station:

References

External links

Railway stations in Valsad district
Mumbai WR railway division
Valsad